Yan, Marquis of Tian (died 375 BC) was from 383 to 375 BC ruler of the State of Qi, a major power during the Warring States period of ancient China.  His personal name was Tián Yǎn (田剡), and ancestral name Gui (媯).

Reign
Yan's father was Duke Tai of Tian Qi, the first Qi ruler from the House of Tian.  Although leaders of the Tian clan had been de facto rulers of Qi since 481 BC, it wasn't until 386 BC that Duke Tai was formally recognized as ruler of Qi by King An of Zhou, the nominal king of all China.  Duke Tai ascended the throne and exiled Duke Kang of Qi, the last Qi ruler from the House of Jiang, to a seaside city.  Duke Tai died two years later and was succeeded by Yan.  Duke Kang died in 379 BC.

In 378 BC the states of Han, Zhao, and Wei invaded Qi and attacked the city of Lingqiu (in present-day Gaotang County, Shandong Province).  In 375 BC Yan was murdered by his younger brother Tian Wu, who usurped the throne and became known as Duke Huan of Tian Qi.  Yan's son Tian Xi was also killed.

Historical records
Because of the lack of reliable records during the Warring States period, the chapter on the House of Tian in Sima Qian's influential Shiji is unreliable and error-prone.  Yan's reign was completely omitted from the Shiji, and he remained largely unknown until the discovery of the Bamboo Annals in 281 AD during the Jin dynasty.

Mausoleum
Yan's mausoleum is located on the Dingzu Mountain (鼎足山) near Qiling Town, in Linzi District of Zibo, Shandong, near the ancient Qi capital Linzi. There are two hill-like tombs built on the same platform. The area is called Two Kings' Cemetery (二王冢), and had been for 2,000 years thought to be the tombs of Duke Huan of Qi and Duke Jing of Qi. However, archaeologists have concluded that they are in fact the tombs of Yan and his brother and murderer, Duke Huan of Tian Qi.

All seven known mausoleums of Tian Qi rulers are now protected as a National Historical and Cultural Site.  Since 2008 they have been included in the tentative list of UNESCO World Heritage Sites as part of the ancient Qi capital and mausoleum complex.

Family
Sons:
 Youngest son, Prince Xi (d. 375 BC)

Ancestry

References

Year of birth unknown
Monarchs of Qi (state)
4th-century BC Chinese monarchs
375 BC deaths
4th-century BC murdered monarchs
Assassinated Chinese politicians